is the protagonist from Yoshihiro Togashi's manga series Hunter × Hunter. A young boy, Gon discovers that his father, who left him at a young age, is actually a world-renowned Hunter, a licensed professional who specializes in fantastical pursuits such as locating rare or unidentified animal species, treasure hunting, surveying unexplored enclaves, or hunting down lawless individuals. Gon departs on a journey to become a Hunter and eventually find his father. Along the way, Gon meets various other Hunters and encounters the paranormal.

Togashi originally created Gon as an ideal son. However, the way he saw his backstory in retrospect made him change his characterization as Gon instead comes across as a selfish teenager for the way he starts his quest. Several voice actors have voiced Gon across his appearances in animated adaptations of Hunter × Hunter and has often appeared in film adaptations. Critical response to Gon's character has been well received with critics praising his character development, design and several actions across the series that made him unique.

Creation and development
In creating the protagonist of the Hunter × Hunter manga series, Yoshihiro Togashi initially thought that Gon's characterization should be that of an ideal son who would easily become the series' most popular character. However, the more he elaborated on the series' story, his idea of Gon changed as he did not see Gon as a nice person as he originally envisioned; The fact that Gon abandons his foster mother Mito just to learn to be a Hunter like his father Ging. Gon and Ging were meant to be similar characters with Gon often sharing a nervous feeling when developing in the story. This led to a major change in of the main character of the series and leave his scrapped nature to another unspecified member from the series.

Gon's personality was kept addressed by Togashi during fight scenes where Togashi scrapped his sensitive side and give the manga a more entertaining side. Togashi feels glad with how he transformed Gon into the series' protagonist due to the fact he could deal with his personality that much. Instead, the original calm personality Togashi aimed to give Gon was given to fellow character Leorio. In dealing with Gon's abilities, Togashi had the idea of having the cast's abilities connect with their personalities such as Kurapika's chains which are connected with his tragic backstory. Gon's abilities were also connected with his abilities with his instinct. Originally, the series' plot would involve the usage of trading cards as main weapons. However, similarities with Kazuki Takahashi's Yu-Gi-Oh led to this being scrapped. Nevertheless, examples of fights using cards can be seen during the Greed Island story arc, where Gon and Killua often use cards.

Casting
Gon was first voiced by Rica Matsumoto in the 1998 Japanese film, and Junko Takeuchi in the 1999 series. Elinor Holt voices him in the 1999 series in English.

In Madhouse adaptation of the series, Gon is voiced by Megumi Han who found it as a unique experience when compared with other works most notably Sumire from Chihayafuru. Voice actress Erica Mendez originally read for Gon, Killua, Kurapika, and Menchi during casting of the series by Madhouse. The actress enjoyed Gon's personality and how well he judges others. However, she still did not like how Gon often put himself in dangerous situations like a common hero and does not care for his own well-being. In voicing the character, Mendez adds adds a rasp to a voice tends to make boy voices sound more believable to the audience, but because of the way they set him, he does not have a lot of rasp unless he is in a tense situation so sometimes he comeas across as feminine, haive and happy.

Appearances

In the Hunter × Hunter manga
Gon Freecss is an athletic, naïve, and friendly boy. Having spent a lot of time in the woods as a child, he gets along very well with animals and has superhuman senses such as heightened sense of smell and sight, as well as very keen taste. Raised by Mito, Gon wants to become a Hunter in order to find his father, Ging, who is a Hunter as well. During the Hunter Exam Gon befriends Killua Zoldyck, Kurapika and Leorio Paradinight. After successfully becoming a licensed Hunter, Gon and Killua learn about Nen from Wing and later train and competes in a tournament test his new powers against his nemesis, the Hunter Hisoka. Gon's Nen type is Enhancement, which gives him his great strength and recuperative abilities. Although Gon loses the match, he manages to return his debt to Hisoka. Both Gon and Killua return to the former's homeland to greet Mito, who reveals to him a recording from Ging and becomes interested in trying his Greed Island video game. However, while searching for samples of Greed Island, he learns that Kurapika is on a fight with the Spider assassins and briefly helps him. After Kurapika quits his fight, Gon and Killua enter into Greed Island where they further train under Biscuit Krueger. Gon develops his Hatsu is called  a play on "Janken", the Japanese word for rock-paper-scissors. When Gon throws out "Rock" it is an enhanced punch, "Scissors" transmutes a sword from his fingers for mid-ranged attacks, and "Paper" emits a ball of aura for long-ranged attacks.

After becoming one of the first people to beat Greed Island, Gon returns to the outside with Killua and meets Kite. and helping to stop the Chimera Ants. When the Chimera Neferpitou nearly attacks them, Killua knocks Gon down and escapes with him while Kite fights alone. Still believing in Kite's safey, Gon continues training with a group of Hunters to face the Chimeras. However, upon entering their territory, Gon is shocked to find Kite's body having into a puppet to train. Enraged Gon confronts Neferpitou, but he finds it unfair that his enemy is instead healing a wounded human. This causes Gon to wait for the healing to end while throwing Killua guilt in his tanctrums. When Neferpitou reveals he cannot heal Kite, Gon enters into a Nen Contract in order to have "all the power [he]'ll ever have" and grows to an older state, which nearly results in his death. After returning to normal thanks to Alluka Zoldyck's ability, Gon has lost the ability to use Nen. Gon meets his father, Ging, who tries to confort him and learns that Kite is still alive through a Chimera.. Following the meeting with his father, Gon decides to return to Whale Island and reunites with Mito. However, he realizes that that ever since his encounter with the Chimera, his Nen has disappeared..

Other appearances
Besides reprising his role from the manga in the anime adaptations, Gon appears in two animated movies. in Hunter × Hunter: Phantom Rouge (2013) Gon and Killua search for Pairo's location to restore Kurapika's missing eyes. Gon ends up meeting and befriending a young puppeteer called Retsu and when Killua reunites with him, they realize that Retsu is a girl. Because of Killua's loyalty towards Gon, Killua quickly becomes jealous of her. When night falls, Leorio and Kurapika are approached by Hisoka while Gon and the others are attacked by Uvogin, who was presumed to be dead and saved by Nobunaga and Machi who defeat him. It is then revealed that Uvogin was revived as a puppet by Omokage, a former member of the Phantom Troupe who was defeated and replaced by Hisoka. In the next day, Retsu leads Gon and Killua to the mansion from Kurapika's vision and after leaving her behind for her safety, they meet another puppet, now based on Illumi who attacks them. Gon has his own eyes stolen. Omokage sends the Pairo and Illumi dolls to attack the Hunters, but Gon and Kurapika defeat them with Leorio and Killua's help and retrieve their eyes.

In Hunter × Hunter: The Last Mission, Gon and Killua take a break from their expeditions with Kite to pay another visit at Heaven's Arena and cheer for their friend Zushi in the Battle Olympia Tournament with Wing and Biscuit.  Gon and Killua pay a visit to Netero, who is also at the building, but the Arena is taken over by the mysterious men, with one of them, Gaki, replacing Zushi's first opponent and defeating him, another one, Shura, taking over the security system and a third one, Rengoku, stabbing herself and putting a curse on Netero to seal his Nen and immobilizing him.

Gon has also appeared in several video games based on the anime. He is also playable in the crossover game game Jump Ultimate Stars, and Jump Force.

Reception

Popularity
Gon Freecss is a popular character with fans, coming in third place in the series' first two popularity polls. In a IGN article, Gon was listed as one of the best anime characters of all time with comments focused on how his characterization is marked by his absent father. SportsKeeda also made an article about Gon's best fights in the entire series with his final fight from the Chimera arc taking the top place. In an Anitrendz poll, Gon was voted as one of the best male characters from the 2010s.

Critical reception
Initial critical response to Gon was positive with Charles Solomon, a writer for The New York Times and Los Angeles Times, praising the moral seriousness of Gon, a quality that gives the protagonist "an appeal his relentlessly upbeat counterparts lack".  On the other hand, DVD Talk said that Gon was one dimensional when compared to the rest of the protagonists as he does not have a deep reason to become a Hunter. Carl Kimlinger from Anime News Network found strange the relationship between Gon and his nemesis Hisoka due to the latter's interest in him and comparing him with a fruit in needs of maturing. Kimlinger also praised the voice acting of Elinor Holt in the English dub. Digital Fox Media noted that his bond with Killua engaging. The Madhouse adaptation of the series received praised for Erica Mendez 's portrayal.

Initial reactions to Gon's characterization led to negative response to the protagonist due to coming across as a common archetype. However, in Anime News Networks article "Hunter x Hunter & Dragon Ball Z: the Fall of the Shounen Hero" was compared with Goku. Anime News Network noted that while Goku feels like a "has that prototypical not-Snyder Superman doesn not" due to his obsession with fighting, Gon instead comes across as a darker character, something briefly explored in Dragon Ball. Gon's dark side was noted to make him fit to become Killua's best friend similar to how Togashi realized in regards to how meanspirited his protagonist ended up coming across in the beginning when abandoning Mito. Anime News Network found that Gon's characterization takes a further darker side in the Chimera arc when his mentor Kite is seemingly killed by a Chimera Pitou and suffers emotional outbursts that cause him offend Killua and instead looks like a villain when he finds the enemy again and finds it unfair that he is trying to heal an innocent girl and cannot heal Kite. Comic Book Resources shared several comments about Gon's darker characterization, most notably in the Chimera arc where his obsession with Kite results in into ruthless revenge against Neferpitou, ruining his likable traits in the process. The Fandom Post praised his character design in the 2011 anime adaptation and his relationship with Killua through the whole series but lamented how inactive he became in the Chimera arc.

There were also positive comments about Gon's friendship with Killua. Derrick L. Tucker of THEM Anime Reviews praised the writing of Gon due to his offbeat personality which contrasts with Killua's darker side and how his goals to improve himself rather than becoming the strongest character set him apart from other main characters of the series genre. However, when Gon's characterization took a darker tone, he was criticized for offending Killua's feeling in his emotional outbursts.

References
Hunter × Hunter mangaEntire seriesTogashi, Yoshihiro. ハンター×ハンター [Hunter × Hunter] (in Japanese). 36 vols. Tokyo: Shueisha, 1998–present.
Togashi, Yoshihiro. Hunter × Hunter. 36 vols. San Francisco: Viz Media, 2005–present.Individual volumes'

Specific

External links
  

Anime and manga characters who can move at superhuman speeds
Anime and manga characters with superhuman strength
Child characters in anime and manga
Comics characters introduced in 1998
Fictional amputees
Fictional characters granted magic or power through dealings
Fictional characters with accelerated ageing
Fictional characters with energy-manipulation abilities
Fictional characters with extrasensory perception
Fictional characters with superhuman durability or invulnerability
Fictional characters with superhuman senses
Fictional energy swordfighters
Fictional fishers
Fictional flexible weapons practitioners
Fictional hunters
Fictional male martial artists
Fictional stick-fighters
Hunter × Hunter
Male characters in anime and manga
Martial artist characters in anime and manga
Teenage characters in anime and manga